The Peculiar Exploits of Brigadier Ffellowes is a collection of fantasy short stories by Sterling E. Lanier.  The stories take the form of tall tales told in a bar or club, similar to the Jorkens stories of Lord Dunsany.  It was first published in New York by Walker in 1971, and in London by Sidgwick & Jackson in 1977. The English edition includes an introduction by Arthur C. Clarke. The collection was also published together with John Morressy's Frostworld and Dreamfire as the Sidgwick & Jackson double Science Fiction Special 35 in 1981. The stories originally appeared in issues of the Fantasy and Science Fiction between August, 1968 and July, 1970.

Contents
 "Introduction" (Arthur C. Clarke) (English edition and later American edition only)
 "His Only Safari" (1970)
 "The Kings of the Sea" (1968)
 "His Coat So Gay" (1965)
 "The Leftovers" (1969)
 "A Feminine Jurisdiction" (1969)
 "Fraternity Brother" (1969)
 "Soldier Key" (1968)

1971 short story collections
Fantasy short story collections
Walker Books books